This is a list of hospitals in the U.S. state of Vermont.

Current

Former

References

 

Vermont

Hospitals